Monsters at Work is an American computer-animated streaming television series that debuted on Disney+ on July 7, 2021, as part of the Monsters, Inc. media franchise.

A direct continuation of the original 2001 film, it features the voices of Billy Crystal and John Goodman reprising their roles as Mike Wazowski and James P. "Sulley" Sullivan from the original film and the 2013 prequel Monsters University; several other voice actors from the films reprise their roles as guests. A second season was announced and is set for release in 2023.

Premise
Monsters at Work begins the day after Henry J. Waternoose III's arrest, with the Monsters, Incorporated factory making the transition to laugh power. Tylor Tuskmon, a recent Scare Major graduate from Monsters University, having previously received a letter of acceptance from Waternoose to be a scarer at the factory, is excited to work at the same company as his idol Sulley. However, Tylor is devastated to learn that the company is no longer in need of scarers, and he is reassigned to work as a mechanic on the Monsters Inc. Facilities Team (MIFT). Meanwhile, Mike and Sulley encounter the trials and tribulations of running the company.

Cast and characters

Main
 Billy Crystal as Mike Wazowski: The self-appointed Senior Co-President of Monsters, Incorporated, Chief Executive Vice-Deputy Administrative Director of Comedy Resources Management, and Sulley's best friend. He is also a top jokester and was Tylor's teacher in comedy during season one.
 John Goodman as James P. "Sulley" Sullivan: The CEO of Monsters, Incorporated and Mike's best friend.
 Ben Feldman as Tylor Tuskmon: A scare graduate from Monsters University who was reassigned to the Monsters, Incorporated Facilities Team. During season one he took part-time classes to be a jokester.
 Mindy Kaling as Val Little: Tylor's acquaintance from Monsters University who shared a class with him during their freshman year before she dropped out. She is an enthusiastic mechanic. As season one progresses, she and Tylor become friends.
 Henry Winkler as Fritz: The friendly and scatterbrained one-eyed Tapir-nosed boss of the facilities team.
 Lucas Neff as:
 Duncan P. Anderson: A cunning, self-centered winged four-eyed plumber who is obsessed with getting Fritz's job, and has a one-sided rivalry with Tylor.
 A human father in "The Damaged Room"
 Richard, a small winged monster in "Little Monsters".
 Alanna Ubach as:
 Katherine "Cutter" Sterns: the officious crab-like rule follower.
 Ubach also voices several minor characters, such as Carla "Killer Claws" Benitez, "Roaring" Rosie Levin, a human mother in "The Damaged Room", and the narrator of the orientation film in "Welcome to Monsters, Incorporated".

Recurring
 Bonnie Hunt as Ms. Flint: A monster who runs the simulation room at Monsters, Incorporated.
 Curtis Armstrong as Mr. Crummyham: A monster with Gecko-like abilities who is a supervisor at Monsters, Incorporated.
 Jennifer Tilly as Celia Mae: Mike's one-eyed and snake-haired girlfriend who has been promoted from Monsters Incorporated receptionist to Laugh Floor supervisor.
 Bob Peterson as:
 Roz: The leader of the Child Detection Agency who previously was undercover as a secretary at Monsters, Incorporated.
 A monster who shares Peterson's name that wears removable teeth. He was originally voiced by the late Jack Angel in the film.
 Roze, Roz's twin sister who takes over Roz's old job.
 Stephen Stanton as:
 Needleman and Smitty: Two workers of Monsters, Incorporated that operate the Door Shredder. They were originally voiced by the late Dan Gerson in the film.
 George Sanderson: A scarer who was the victim of the code "23-19". He was originally voiced by Sam Black in the film.
 Christopher Swindle as:
 Jeff Fungus: The former scare assistant of Randall J. Boggs who is now Mike's laugh assistant. He was originally voiced by Frank Oz in the first film.
 Thaddeus "Phlegm" Bile: A trainee monster. He was originally voiced by Jeff Pidgeon in the film.
 Theodore "Ted" Pauley: A monster with 16 removable eyes. He was originally voiced by Katherine Ringgold in the film.
 Chuck: The assistant of Pete "Claws" Ward. He was originally voiced by Danny Mann in the film.

Other cast members include Bobs Gannaway as Otis, the new Monsters, Incorporated receptionist, and Roto, Duncan's pet, Gabriel Iglesias as Gary Gibbs, Mike Wazowski's arch-nemesis who appears in "The Big Wazowskis" and "Bad Hair Day", and Dee Bradley Baker as Winchester: the non-verbal member of the Monsters, Incorporated Facilities Team, nicknamed "Banana Bread".

Alfred Molina reprises his role as Professor Derek Knight from Monsters University (2013) in "Welcome to Monsters, Incorporated". John Ratzenberger reprises his role as the Abominable Snowman from the original film and Monsters University in "Adorable Returns" and "Little Monsters". Ratzenberger also voices Tylor's father Bernard who appears in "Adorable Returns".

Aisha Tyler guest stars in "Meet Mift" as Tylor's mother Millie and John Michael Higgins guest stars as Argus Blinks in "The Cover Up". Bob Uecker guest stars in "The Damaged Room" as a monster parody of himself named Bob Yucker. Gannaway's daughter Hadley guest stars in "Little Monsters" as Ms. Flint's daughter Thalia. In addition, Devin Bright, Cooper Friedman, Lucian Perez, and Isabella Abiera voice monster children in "Little Monsters".

Additional monster voices include Carlos Alazraqui, Ferrell Barron, Hiromi Dames, Michaela Dietz, and Dave Wittenberg.

Episodes

Production

Development 
During The Walt Disney Company's earnings call, in November 2017, CEO Bob Iger announced that a new series set in the universe of Monsters, Inc., was in development for their planned streaming service Disney+. The series is produced by Disney Television Animation. Longtime Disney Television producer Bobs Gannaway served as showrunner for the first season. He was asked to work on the series after development began, due to his experience on both TV animation and films, having directed the Cars spin-off Planes: Fire & Rescue.

During the 2019 D23 Expo, Gannaway and producer Ferrell Barron revealed that employees from Walt Disney Animation Studios and Pixar were also involved in the production, to create a series that Barron described as "unique and special". Monsters, Inc. filmmakers, including director and Pixar's chief creative officer Pete Docter, provided the team with both used and unused concept art from the film, with the unused concept art being recycled for the series. Gannaway stated that the creative leaders at Pixar were, "very supportive of the show" and additionally stated, "they were also very much like 'Go out and create new characters and have fun.' So, it wasn't by any means any kind of policing situation. It was go have fun in the world with your new characters."

In February 2020, Stephen J. Anderson revealed that he would serve as one of the directors on the series. Anderson joined the series eight months before Disney Television Animation was temporarily closed due to the COVID-19 pandemic, after being approached personally by Gannaway. In early 2021, Billy Crystal revealed that production had slightly slowed down due to the COVID-19 pandemic, but that it should be released later that year.

In September 2021, cast member Henry Winkler indicated that a second season is in development. The second season was officially announced at Annecy International Animation Film Festival 2022, with Kevin Deters and Stevie Wermers (the Prep & Landing shorts, Olaf's Frozen Adventure) replacing Gannaway and Anderson as showrunner and supervising director, respectively.

Writing
According to Anderson, Pixar assisted the producers on the series by providing notes during its writing and early storyboarding process in order to "keep [them] on track as far as the legacy of the project". He also said that the series would differ from the films by further exploring "different areas of Monsters, Inc.", and that the series would further explore the transition in the company from screams to laughs seen at the end of the first film. Anderson also said that the series would feature an overarching story, but certain episodes would focus more on character development than the overall arc.

The series expands the role of the female characters in the original film, with receptionist Celia Mae being promoted to Laugh Floor supervisor in order to "move a female character up into a leadership role", as well as featuring trainer Ms. Flint's reaction to the transition from scares to laughter. The series also features a new character named Roze, who is Roz's twin sister, as the producers felt that, due to the latter being revealed as the head of the "Child Detection Agency" at the end of the first film, "she wouldn't be back outside the laugh floor". In addition, Bob Peterson, story supervisor on Monsters, Inc., serves as a creative consultant for the series.

According to Gannaway, it took the producers almost a year to conceive the series' premise. He also compared Tylor's struggles with the transition with the current world status due to the COVID-19 pandemic, feeling that both the character and the audiences had "the universe [throw them] a curveball", which he felt made Tylor a more relatable character by having flaws the audience could connect with. Gannaway also said he wanted the series to have "the sort of feel of a Pixar story" by making the audience care about Tylor and his personal journey.

Gannaway was originally not going to include the characters of Smitty and Needleman out of respect for their voice actor, the late Dan Gerson. However, he eventually incorporated them into the series when he felt Gerson would want the characters to continue even after his death. Gannaway paid an homage to Gerson by including a "Gerson Industries" logo in the trash cans the duo push.

In order to get a sense of what it was like working in a factory, the production team visited two power plants and would interview the workers about their day. Gannaway stated, "You want to tether everything to truth. You can't make a movie about a power plant if you haven't walked one; otherwise you're just making stuff up."

Casting and recording 
John Goodman and Billy Crystal reprise their roles for the series alongside John Ratzenberger, Jennifer Tilly, and Bob Peterson, with the new cast including Ben Feldman, Kelly Marie Tran, Henry Winkler, Lucas Neff, Alanna Ubach, Stephen Stanton and Aisha Tyler. In February 2020, director Stephen J. Anderson revealed that recording for the series had already begun. In March 2021, Mindy Kaling and Bonnie Hunt joined the cast, with Kaling replacing Tran as Val Little and Hunt reprising her role as Mrs. Flint from the original film. In an interview with The New York Times, it was confirmed that Boo, the human child that Sulley and Mike befriended in the original film, would not be making an appearance. Bobs Gannaway stated that he had discussions with Monsters, Inc. director Pete Docter, and they both agreed that they wanted to keep the relationship ambiguous, with Gannaway stating, "Everyone agreed that we wanted to leave it to the world to decide how that relationship continued."

Animation and design 
Animation for the series was produced by ICON Creative Studio, in Canada. Animation work on the series began shortly before Disney Television Animation was closed in response to the COVID-19 pandemic, forcing the producers to continue work remotely. According to director Stephen J. Anderson, work on storyboards and layouts for the second and third episodes were done remotely during the pandemic.

Music
British composer Dominic Lewis (who previously scored the 2017 reboot of DuckTales) was announced as the series composer. Lewis said the score was mainly inspired by Randy Newman's jazzy score from the first film. Lewis also performed the theme song, which is an a cappella rendition of Newman's opening credits music from the first film. The soundtrack album was released digitally and on streaming on July 9, 2021.

Track listing

Marketing 
A teaser trailer for the series was released on May 18, 2021. The first trailer for the series was released on June 11, 2021.

Release
Monsters at Work debuted on July 7, 2021, releasing weekly on Wednesdays, and consists of 10 episodes. It was previously set to release sometime in 2020, but then changed to early 2021, then to July 2, 2021, then finally to its current date, with a two-episode premiere. The series made its linear premiere on Disney Channel on January 6, 2023, and on Disney XD on January 9, 2023.

Reception

Audience viewership 
According to Whip Media's viewership tracking app TV Time, Monsters at Work was the 3rd most anticipated new television series of July 2021. According to Whip Media, Monsters at Work was the top rising show, based on the week-over-week growth in episodes watched for a specific program, during the week of July 11, 2022.

Critical reception 
The review aggregator website Rotten Tomatoes reported a 65% approval rating with an average score of 6.20/10 based on 26 critic reviews. The website's critics consensus reads, "If Monsters at Work doesn't quite capture the magic of the original film, it's charming and silly enough to entertain fans of all ages." Metacritic, which uses a weighted average, assigned a score of 55 out of 100 based on 9 critics, indicating "mixed or average reviews".

Petrana Radulovic of Polygon praised the animation of the series, complimented its humor, and found the premise interesting, writing, "With a huge cast of characters and humor that waddles along the line between silliness and sharp societal commentary, Monsters at Work balances a whole lot." Brian Lowry of CNN gave the show a positive review and said, "The show doesn't deliver belly laughs, but it nimbly slides into the Monsters [Inc.] timeline and cleverly builds on a particularly fertile Pixar concept." Ashley Moulton of Common Sense Media rated the series 4 out of 5 stars, praised the depiction of positive messages, citing perseverance and acceptance, and complimented the presence of role models, saying, "Most characters model pro-social behaviors like friendliness and working hard." Alan Sepinwall of Rolling Stone rated the show 3.5 out of 5 and stated, "Combine them with some well-executed slapstick set pieces that evoke the two movies without feeling like rehashes, and the early episodes set up the foundation for a solid all-ages comedy." Ben Travers of Indiewire gave the show a 'B−' score and stated, "If you love original movies and were expecting a third, Monsters at Work might be a bit disappointing. But if you can still appreciate the world-building, [the] series might still hit its laugh quotas." Richard Roeper of Chicago Sun-Times gave the show 3 out of 4 and stated, "Monsters at Work isn't on the same level as the two feature films, but it's miles ahead of the likes of The Return of Jafar or Kronk's New Groove."

Scott Bryan of BBC gave the show a negative review and stated, "As someone who loves the films, I wonder ... do we need more of it? The films are so well self-contained. This feels like an excess of something we don't really need." Chris Vognar of San Francisco Chronicle rated the show 2 out of 4 and wrote, "This is a solid effort, even if it doesn't quite shimmer like your top-of-the-line Pixar favorites." Brian Tallerico of RogerEbert.com gave the show a negative review and stated, "Any hope that the Pixar charm would rub off on a Pixar show like Monsters at Work doesn't pay off in the first two episodes." Lucy Mangan of The Guardian gave the show 2 out of 5 stars and stated, "It feels like a long wait at times. The first two half-hour episodes (the only ones of the 10 that were available for review) are extraordinarily slow." Anita Singh of The Daily Telegraph gave the show 2 out of 5 and stated, "Bafflingly, it's a workplace comedy. Note to Disney: children don't go to work."

Accolades

Notes

References

External links 
 Production website
 
 

Monsters, Inc.
2020s American animated television series
2020s American workplace comedy television series
2021 American television series debuts
American children's animated comedy television series
American children's animated fantasy television series
American computer-animated television series
American sequel television series
Animated television series about monsters
Animated television shows based on films
English-language television shows
Disney+ original programming
Disney animated television series
Television series based on Disney films
Television series by Disney Television Animation
Children's and Family Emmy Award winners